Edith Helen Major, CBE (15 February 1867 – 17 March 1951) was an Irish educationalist.

Major was born in Lisburn and educated at Methodist College Belfast and Girton College, Cambridge. She was Assistant Mistress at  Blackheath High School from 1891 to 1900; Headmistress of Putney High School from 1891 to 1910; and Head Mistress of King Edward VI High School for Girls from 1910 until 1925. Major was Mistress of Girton College, Cambridge from 1925  until 1931.

References

1867 births
1951 deaths
People educated at Methodist College Belfast
Irish women educators
Alumni of Girton College, Cambridge
Mistresses of Girton College, Cambridge
People from Lisburn
Commanders of the Order of the British Empire
19th-century Irish educators
20th-century Irish educators
19th-century women educators
20th-century women educators
Steamboat ladies